Capnodium footii is a sooty mold that develops in coconut leaves.

References

External links 
Index Fungorum
USDA ARS Fungal Database

Fungal plant pathogens and diseases
Coconut palm diseases
Leaf diseases
Capnodiaceae
Fungi described in 1849
Taxa named by Miles Joseph Berkeley
Taxa named by John Baptiste Henri Joseph Desmazières